Felix Stähelin (also spelled Staehelin, 28 December 1873 – 20 February 1952) was a Swiss historian of Basel.

He studied ancient history and classical philology in Basel, Bonn and Berlin, completing a doctorate on the Galatians in 1897. He worked as a school teacher from 1902–1907, and as a lecturer at Basel from 1907, receiving tenure as professor of Ancient History in 1931, retiring in 1937.

He published works about the history of the Roman Empire and of Asia Minor. He is best known for his 1927 work on Switzerland in the Roman era. During 1929–1934 he also co-edited the collected works of   Jacob Burckhardt.

Bibliography 
1897  Geschichte der Kleinasiatischen Galater bis zur Errichtung der römischen Provinz Asia  
 1903 Geschichte der Basler Familie Stehelin und Stähelin  
 1927 Die Schweiz in römischer Zeit 
1956 (ed. Wilhelm Abt) Reden und Vorträge

References 
 Eberhard Zellweger: Zur Erinnerung an Professor Dr. Felix Staehelin-Schwarz, geboren den 28. Dezember 1873, gestorben den 20. Februar 1952. Privatdruck, Basel 1952
 Rudolf Laur-Belart:  "Worte der Erinnerung an Prof. Dr. Felix Stähelin (1873–1952)". In: Basler Zeitschrift für Geschichte und Altertumskunde. Band 51 (1952), S. 5–8
 "Felix Staehelin 1873–1952". In: Schweizerische Zeitschrift für Geschichte. Band 2 (1953), S. 264–267
 Jochen Bleicken, Martin Staehelin: "Ein unbekannter Brief von Ulrich von Wilamowitz-Moellendorff an Felix Staehelin über die 'Geschichte der kleinasiatischen Galater'". In: Klio. volume 76 (1994),  (Jochen Bleicken: Gesammelte Schriften. Stuttgart 1998)
 

20th-century Swiss historians
Swiss male writers
Academic staff of the University of Basel
1873 births
1952 deaths
Members of the German Academy of Sciences at Berlin
Expatriates from Switzerland in the German Empire